Simon Castets (b. Caen, France, 1984) is a French curator who has been serving as the Director of Strategic Initiatives of LUMA Arles, France and Executive Chair of Swiss Institute Contemporary Art New York, where he was Director from 2013 to 2021.

Early life and education
Castets holds an MA in Curatorial Studies from Columbia University and an MA in Cultural Management from Sciences Po, Paris.

Career
In addition to exhibitions at Swiss Institute, recent curatorial work includes the 2018 Samdani Art Award for the Dhaka Art Summit; Americans 2017 at LUMA Foundation, Zurich, together with Hans Ulrich Obrist (2017, as a part of 89plus, a research project they co-founded in 2013); Rachel Rose at Aspen Art Museum, (2016); Poetry will be made by all! at LUMA Foundation and Moderna Museet, Stockholm, also with Hans Ulrich Obrist (2014); and Champs Elysées at Palais de Tokyo, Paris, with Julie Boukobza and Nicola Trezzi (2013). Following the 2013 Digital Life Design conference, Castets and Obrist launched 89plus, a research project that seeks to foster and bring together artists born in, or after, 1989. 

Castets also regularly contributes to catalogues and periodicals and frequently participates in panels and juries internationally. Under the leadership of Daniel Birnbaum, he served on the jury for the 2017 Absolut Art Award, which was given to Anne Imhof and Huey Copeland.

Publications 
SInce 1986
by Simon Castets (Editor, Author), Karen Marta (Editor), Mary Staniszewski (Author), Laura McLean-Ferris (Author)
Co-published with Swiss Institute and Koenig Books, London, 2019.

Jeremy Shaw
Christine Macel (Editor) and Simon Castets (Editor).
With contributions by Simon Castets, Nora M. Khan, Christine Macel, Laura McLean-Ferris and Monika Szewczyk.
Published by Centre Pompidou, Paris and Swiss Institute, New York, 2020.

PAVILLON DE L’ESPRIT NOUVEAU: A 21st Century Show Home 
Texts by Carson Chan, Trish Goff, Marc Matchak, Shawn Maximo.
Felix Burrichter (Editor), Simon Castets (Editor), Karen Marta (Editor).
Published by The Swiss Institute.

David Weiss: Works, 1968-1979
Karen Marta (Editor), Simon Castets (Editor).
Text by Douglas Fogle, Urs Lüthi, Hans Ulrich Obrist, David Weiss.
Published by Swiss Institute / Karma, New York.

The St. Petersburg Paradox
Karen Marta (Editor), Simon Castets (Editor).
Text by Ericka Beckman, A.E. Benenson, Walter Benjamin, Fredric Brandt, Vitalik Buterin, Alex Mackin Dolan, Hugh Scott Douglas, Cooper Francis, Sam Frank, Konstantin Genin, Remco Heesen, Nicolas Langlitz, Scott Lyall, Tabor Robak, Ben Schumacher, Emily Segal, Amalia Ulman, Douglas Wilson, Eric Zimmerman.
Published by Swiss Institute / Karma, New York.

Heidi Bucher
Karen Marta (Editor), Simon Castets (Editor).
Text by Indigo Bucher, Mayo Bucher, Bice Curiger, Heike Munder, Beatrix Ruf, Christian Scheidemann, Philip Ursprung.
Published by Swiss Institute / Karma, New York.

Allyson Vieira: The Plural Present
Karen Marta (Editor), Simon Castets (Editor).
Text by Joe Fyfe, Amelia Groom, William Hanley, Adam Szymczyk.
Published by Swiss Institute / Kunsthalle Basel / Karma, New York.

References 

https://switzerlandusa.medium.com/meet-simon-castets-director-of-the-swiss-institute-contemporary-art-new-york-31cc8a5a5486

https://curatorsintl.org/collaborators/simon-castets 

https://www.aspenartmuseum.org/exhibitions/76-rachel-rose

https://www.e-flux.com/announcements/132619/89plusamericans-2017/

https://www.89plus.com/ 

http://www.federicovavassori.com/exhibitions/sarah-ortmeyer 

https://www.past.dhakaartsummit.org/guest-curators

https://www.takaishiigallery.com/en/archives/1498/ 

https://artmap.com/yvonlambert/exhibition/a-stone-left-unturned-2013?print=do

https://www.swissinstitute.net/about/

1984 births
Writers from Caen
Living people
French art curators
Columbia University alumni